Dublin University is a university constituency in Ireland, which currently elects three senators to Seanad Éireann. Its electorate comprises the undergraduate scholars and graduates of the University of Dublin, whose sole constituent college is Trinity College Dublin, so it is often also referred to as the Trinity College constituency. Between 1613 and 1937 it elected MPs or TDs to a series of representative legislative bodies.

Representation

House of Commons of Ireland (1613–1800)

When James I first convened the Parliament of Ireland, the University of Dublin was given two MPs, elected by the Provost, Fellows and Scholars of Trinity College. It was not represented among the 30 Irish MPs which were part of the Protectorate Parliament during the Commonwealth of England, Scotland and Ireland.

Party organisations were not persistent during this time period, and have been added where appropriate. Among the MPs for the university in this period was John FitzGibbon, who later as Lord Chancellor of Ireland played a key role in the passage of the Acts of Union 1800, which merged the Kingdom of Ireland with the Kingdom of Great Britain to create the United Kingdom of Great Britain and Ireland.

House of Commons of the United Kingdom (1801–1922)

The Acts of Union 1800 merged the Parliament of Ireland with the Parliament of Great Britain, to form the Parliament of the United Kingdom. The 300 seats in the Irish House of Commons were reduced to 100 Irish members in the House of Commons of the United Kingdom. The union took effect on 1 January 1801. The University of Dublin had one seat in this Parliament. There was no new election for the First Parliament of the United Kingdom: for constituencies like the University of Dublin which were reduced to one MP, they were chosen by lot, in this instance, George Knox.

In the Representation of the People (Ireland) Act 1832, the university was given a second seat in Parliament, elected by plurality-at-large, and the franchise was extended to all those with a Master of Arts degree. At this stage, there were 2,073 voters on the register. Plural voting, by those who held a vote in the university constituency and also in a geographical one, was allowed and prevalent.

A Topographical Directory of Ireland, published in 1837, describes the Parliamentary history of the university.

The Representation of the People Act 1918 extended the electorate to include all male graduates and scholars over the age of 21 and all female graduates and scholars over the age of 30, to be elected by single transferable vote. There were 4,541 voters registered for the 1918 general election. Plural voting continued to be allowed.

During the period of the Union between Ireland and Great Britain, the constituency predominantly elected Tory, Conservative and Unionist MPs, including Edward Gibson, who was later (as Lord Ashbourne) responsible for the Purchase of Land (Ireland) Act 1885, and Edward Carson, who led the Irish Unionist Alliance.

Dublin University was represented in the House of Commons until the dissolution of Parliament on 26 October 1922, shortly before the establishment of the Irish Free State became a dominion on 6 December 1922.

House of Commons of Southern Ireland (1921–1922)

The Government of Ireland Act 1920 established a devolved home rule legislature, within the United Kingdom, for twenty-six Irish counties which were designated Southern Ireland.

Dublin University was given four seats in the House of Commons of Southern Ireland. The seats were filled by Independent Unionist MPs who were returned unopposed. They were the only MPs who attended the abortive first meeting of the House. After the signing of the Anglo-Irish Treaty, the four MPs met with the Pro-Treaty members of the Second Dáil to ratify the Treaty. The Parliament was formally dissolved as part of the arrangements under the Treaty and the establishment of the Irish Free State on 6 December 1922.

Dáil Éireann (1918–1937)
Sinn Féin contested the 1918 Westminster election on the basis that they would not take seats in the United Kingdom Parliament but would establish a revolutionary assembly in Dublin.

The university was, in Irish republican theory, entitled to return two Teachtaí Dála (known in English as Deputies and abbreviated as TDs) in 1918 to serve in the Irish Republic's First Dáil. This revolutionary body assembled on 21 January 1919.

In republican theory every MP elected in Ireland, including the two Unionist MPs from Dublin University, was a member of the First Dáil. In practice only Sinn Féin members participated.

The First Dáil passed a motion at its last meeting on 10 May 1921, the first three parts of which make explicit the republican view:
That the Parliamentary elections which are to take place during the present month be regarded as elections to Dáil Éireann.
That all deputies duly returned at these elections be regarded as members of Dáil Éireann and allowed to take their seats on subscribing to the proposed Oath of Allegiance.
That the present Dáil dissolve automatically as soon as the new body has been summoned by the President and called to order.
The Second Dáil first met on 16 August 1921, thereby dissolving the First Dáil.

Sinn Féin used the polls for the Northern Ireland House of Commons and the House of Commons of Southern Ireland as an election for the Irish Republic's Second Dáil. No actual voting was necessary in Southern Ireland as all the seats were filled by unopposed returns. Except for this university all other constituencies elected Sinn Féin TDs. The university elected four Independent Unionist members unopposed. As with the First Dáil, those Deputies could have joined the Dáil if they chose.

The Third Dáil elected in 1922 was, in United Kingdom law, the constituent assembly for the Irish Free State. From this time the Dáil represented only the twenty-six Irish counties and not the six counties of Northern Ireland. Non-Sinn Féin Deputies, including those from the university, began to participate in the Dáil.

In the Electoral Act 1923, the Irish Free State defined its own Dáil constituencies. The University of Dublin was granted three seats, to be elected by single transferable vote by all graduates and scholars, regardless of sex, over the age of 21. Plural voting was not allowed.

The Constitution (Amendment No. 23) Act 1936, removed the provisions in Constitution of the Irish Free State for University representation in Dáil Éireann, with effect from the next dissolution of the Oireachtas, which took place on 14 June 1937. Voters resident in the State had their Dáil registration switched to the geographical constituency of their registered address.

|}

Seanad Éireann (1938 to present)
Article 18.4 of the Constitution of Ireland adopted in 1937, provided that the university would have three seats in the new Seanad Éireann (Upper House). The Seanad Electoral (University Members) Act 1937 gave effect to the constitutional provision, and provided that they would be elected by single transferable vote. The first Seanad election took place in 1938, and thereafter elections to the Seanad take place within 90 days of the dissolution of the Dáil. The Seventh Amendment of the Constitution, adopted in 1979, allows for a redistribution of the six university seats among the University of Dublin, the National University of Ireland, and any other institutions of higher education in the State which do not have representation. No legislation followed since to make any such change.

The electorate is Irish citizens who have received a degree from the university, or undergraduates who have been awarded a foundation scholarship or non-foundation scholarship at Trinity College. After the Fourth Amendment in 1972, the age of eligibility was lowered from 21 to 18. Voting for the Seanad is distinct from that for the Dáil, so it is not considered plural voting; however, plural voting is possible for those who have received degrees from both the University of Dublin and the National University of Ireland. Trinity College Dublin is the sole constituent college of the University of Dublin, so the electorate is predominantly composed of graduates of Trinity; however, from 1975 to 1998, the University of Dublin also awarded the degrees of graduates at the Dublin Institute of Technology.

Nominations are by electors in their personal capacity; unlike Dáil elections, there is no provision for nomination by parties. Most of the senators for the constituency have campaigned as Independents, though Mary Robinson and Ivana Bacik took the Labour Party whip for periods of their time in the Seanad.

A number of the senators have a reputation of being quite socially liberal, including Owen Sheehy-Skeffington, Noël Browne, and Catherine McGuinness. Three Senators were later appointed to the Supreme Court: T. C. Kingsmill Moore, Gardner Budd and Catherine McGuinness. Mary Robinson, first elected in 1969, was later elected as President of Ireland in 1990. In 1987, David Norris became the first openly gay member of either house of the Oireachtas. The senators have often included current or recent academics within Trinity College, such as professor of Latin and provost Ernest Alton, professor of Greek William Bedell Stanford, professor of mathematics Trevor West, professor of medicine Mary Henry, Ivana Bacik in law, and David Norris in English.

Elections
From 1832 (when registers of electors were first prepared) a turnout figure is given, for the percentage of the registered electors who voted. If the number of registered electors eligible to take part in a contested election is unknown, then the last known electorate figure is used to calculate an estimated turnout. If the numbers of registered electors and electors taking part in the poll are known, an exact turnout figure is calculated. In two member bloc vote elections (in which an elector could cast one or two votes as he chose), where the exact number of electors participating is unknown, an estimated turnout figure is given. This is calculated by dividing the total number of votes cast by two. To the extent that electors used only one of their votes the estimated turnout figure is an underestimate.

Elections in the 2020s

Elections in the 2010s

In 2011 Karin Dubsky, who was listed on the printed ballot papers, discovered after their distribution that she was not an Irish citizen and thus ineligible, and advised electors not to vote for her. The returning officer ruled that ballots giving her a first preference would be excluded, but ballots giving her a lower preference would be transferred to the next lower preference when relevant.

Elections in the 2000s

Elections in the 1990s

Elections in the 1980s

Elections in the 1970s
Following the resignation of Conor Cruise O'Brien on 13 June 1979.

Elections in the 1960s
Following the death of William Fearon on 27 December 1959.

Elections in the 1940s

Elections in the 1930s

Held on 13 October 1933, following the death of independent TD Sir James Craig.

|}

Elections in the 1920s

|}

Elections in the 1910s

Caused by Samuels' appointment to the High Court of Justice in Ireland.

This was the last UK Parliament election held in the 26 counties which became the Irish Free State.

 Note: The Times edition of 23 December 1918 reported that the Provost of the University, as returning officer, did not announce the figures. It was ascertained that Woods had 1,094 votes when elected. The above is the best reconstruction of the later counts which is possible with the available information.

Caused by Samuels' appointment as Solicitor-General for Ireland.

Caused by Campbell's appointment as Lord Chief Justice of Ireland.

Caused by Campbell's appointment as Attorney-General for Ireland.

Elections in the 1900s

Caused by Lecky's resignation.

Caused by Carson's appointment as Solicitor General for England and Wales.

Elections in the 1890s

Caused by Plunket's succession to the peerage, becoming Baron Rathmore.

Elections in the 1880s

Caused by Madden's appointment as Solicitor-General for Ireland.

Caused by Holmes' appointment as a judge.

Caused by Plunket's appointment as First Commissioner of Works, and Holmes' appointment as Attorney-General for Ireland.

 

Caused by Plunket's appointment as First Commissioner of Works, and Gibson's appointment as Lord Chancellor of Ireland, becoming Baron Ashbourne.

Elections in the 1870s

Caused by Gibson's appointment as Solicitor-General for Ireland.

Caused by Plunket's appointment as Solicitor-General for Ireland.

 
Caused by Ball's appointment as Lord Chancellor of Ireland.

Caused by Ball's appointment as Solicitor-General for Ireland.

Caused by Lefroy's resignation.

Elections in the 1860s

 

Caused by Chatterton's appointment as Vice-Chancellor of Ireland.

Caused by Chatterton's appointment as Attorney-General for Ireland.

Caused by Walsh's appointment as Master of the Rolls in Ireland

Caused by Whiteside's appointment as Lord Chief Justice of Ireland

Elections in the 1850s

Caused by Hamilton's resignation.

Caused by Napier's appointment as Lord Chancellor of Ireland.

 

Caused by Napier's appointment as Attorney-General for Ireland.

Elections in the 1840s

Caused by Shaw's resignation.

Caused by Jackson's appointment as Justice of the Court of Common Pleas in Ireland.

Caused by Lefroy's appointment as Baron of the Court of Exchequer in Ireland.

Elections in the 1830s

The constituency gained a second seat at the 1832 general election under the Representation of the People (Ireland) Act 1832.

Elections in the 1820s

Caused by Plunket's succession to the peerage, becoming Baron Plunket.

Caused by Plunket's appointment as Attorney-General for Ireland.

Elections in the 1810s

Elections in the 1800s

Caused by Knox's appointment as a Lord Commissioner of the Treasury.

The constituency had two seats in the Irish House of Commons. This was reduced to one seat for the 1801 co-option. Lots were drawn to determine which of the two MPs, George Knox and Arthur Browne, would get the seat.

See also
List of Irish constituencies
List of United Kingdom Parliament constituencies in Ireland and Northern Ireland
Historic Dáil constituencies
Dáil Éireann (Irish Republic)

References

Sources

The Parliaments of England by Henry Stooks Smith (1st edition published in three volumes 1844–50), second edition edited (in one volume) by F.W.S. Craig (Political Reference Publications 1973)

Oxford Dictionary of National Biography
The Times (of London), editions of 23 December 1918 and 17 June 1927

Citations

1613 establishments in Ireland
Constituencies established in 1613
Dublin University
Constituencies of the Parliament of the United Kingdom disestablished in 1922
Constituencies of the Parliament of the United Kingdom established in 1801
Dublin
University of Dublin
Westminster constituencies in County Dublin (historic)
Dublin
Seanad constituencies
Constituencies of the Parliament of Ireland (pre-1801)